Dematerialization may refer to:

 Dematerialization (art), an idea in conceptual art where the art object is no longer material
 Dematerialization (economics), the reduction in the quantity of materials required to serve economic functions (doing more with less)
 Dematerialization (products), using less or no material to deliver the same level of functionality
 Dematerialization (securities), moving from handling paper securities certificates to book form, usually electronic
 Demat account, a type of banking account in India where paper-based physical shares are stored electronically
 Teleportation, theoretical movement of objects without traveling through space

See also
 Materialization (disambiguation)